Truro and Newquay was a proposed parliamentary constituency in Cornwall. It was planned to take effect from the election in May 2022 before the 2019 general election but the Parliamentary Constituencies (Amendment) Bill was not passed. Electoral Calculus predicted that the new seat would have been a fairly safe Conservative win, with 51.3% of the predicted vote. It was predicted to have 74,228 constituents. The seat was scrapped after the government halted the re-drawing in 2020, saying that the "change in policy" had been brought about due to the UK's exit from the EU.

Changes
The proposed boundaries excluded Falmouth which would have joined the current constituency of Camborne and Redruth to make Falmouth, Camborne and Redruth. To make up for this, the constituency would have included the town of Newquay.

Councillor Malcolm Brown argued that St Columb Major should also be in the Truro and Newquay constituency, rather than in the planned Bodmin and St Austell. It was expected that the electoral division of St Columb Major and Colan would have been included within the new boundaries.

Boundaries
It was proposed that the constituency roughly encompassed Truro and Newquay. More specifically, it would have included the following wards:

Chacewater, Kenwyn and Baldhu
Feock and Playing Place
Ladock, St Clement and St Erme
Mount Hawke and Portreath
Newlyn and Goonhavern
Newquay Central
Newquay Pentire
Newquay Treloggan
Newquay Tretherras
Newquay Treviglas
Perranporth
Probus, Tregony and Grampound

Roseland 
St Agnes
St Dennis and Nanpean
St Enoder
St Mawgan and Colan
St Stephen-in-Brannel
Threemilestone and Gloweth
Truro Boscawen
Truro Redannick
Truro Tregolls
Truro Trehaverne

See also

List of parliamentary constituencies in Cornwall
Devonwall (possible UK Parliament constituency) - a constituency also proposed in the 2018 review

References

Politics of Truro
Parliamentary constituencies in Cornwall (historic)
Newquay